Herbert E. Howe Jr. (October 15, 1942 – November 4, 2012) was an American psychologist and educationist, and was a senior administrator at the University of Nebraska–Lincoln. Previously he served as Chair of the Department of Psychology in the same university.

Howe served as Associate to the Chancellor at the University of Nebraska-Lincoln from September 1987 through July 2007, serving as the chief of staff for four chancellors and two interim chancellors during his tenure.

In 1969, fresh from Penn State University, Howe began his career at the University of Nebraska-Lincoln with a joint appointment in English and Psychology.  His doctoral dissertation was entitled: A psychological investigation of the relative dominance of linguistic cues in decoding and surface structure of English sentences.

References

External links
 Howe Biography on Prarire Fire

1942 births
2012 deaths
20th-century American psychologists
Pennsylvania State University alumni
University of Nebraska–Lincoln faculty